James Mueller may refer to:

 James Mueller (Ohio politician) (active 1971–1974), former member of the Ohio House of Representatives
 James Mueller (Indiana politician) (born 1982), mayor of South Bend, Indiana
 Jim Mueller (1943–2022), American sportscaster